Karl Kling (16 September 1910, Gießen – 18 March 2003, Gaienhofen on Lake Constance, Germany) was a motor racing driver and manager from Germany. He participated in 11 Formula One Grands Prix, debuting on 4 July 1954. He achieved 2 podiums - the first German ever to achieve a Formula One podium - and scored a total of 17 championship points.

It is said, that he was born too late and too early. Unusually, Kling found his way into motorsport via his first job as a reception clerk at Daimler-Benz in the mid-1930s, competing in hillclimb and trials events in production machinery in his spare time. During the Second World War he gained mechanical experience servicing Luftwaffe aircraft, and after the cessation of hostilities he resumed his motorsport involvement in a BMW 328.

Kling was instrumental in developing Mercedes' return to international competition in the early 1950s, and his win in the 1952 Carrera Panamericana road race, driving the then-experimental Mercedes-Benz 300SL was a defining point in assuring the Daimler-Benz management that motorsport had a place in Mercedes' future. Called up to the revived Mercedes Grand Prix squad in 1954 he finished less than one second behind the legendary Juan Manuel Fangio on his Formula One debut, taking second place in the 1954 French Grand Prix at the fast Reims-Gueux circuit. This promising start was not to last, and with the arrival of Stirling Moss at Mercedes in 1955 Kling was effectively demoted to third driver. However, away from the World Championship, Kling took an impressive victory in the Berlin Grand Prix (at AVUS, another high-speed circuit). He left the Formula One team at the end of the season, to succeed Alfred Neubauer as head of Mercedes motorsport. He was in this post during their successful rallying campaigns of the 1960s, occasionally taking the wheel himself. On one such occasion he drove a Mercedes-Benz 220SE to victory in the mighty 1961 Algiers-Cape Town trans-African rally.

He died in 2003 at the age of 92.

Complete Formula One World Championship results
(key)

* Shared drive with Stirling Moss and Hans Herrmann.

Non-championship results
(key) (Races in bold indicate pole position)
(Races in italics indicate fastest lap)

Complete 24 Hours of Le Mans results

References

Further reading
 Karl Kling, G. Molter, Pursuit of Victory (Bodley Head, London, 1956)

German racing drivers
German Formula One drivers
Mercedes-Benz Formula One drivers
1910 births
2003 deaths
24 Hours of Le Mans drivers
Sportspeople from Giessen
Racing drivers from Hesse
World Sportscar Championship drivers
DAMC 05 people
Luftwaffe personnel of World War II
Carrera Panamericana drivers